Garden & Gun is a national magazine focusing on the American South. The magazine reports on the South's culture, food, music, art, literature, and its people and their ideas. It was created in 2007, published by the Evening Post Publishing Company. Since 2008, it has been owned by the Allée Group LLC.
The company also produces the Whole Hog podcast, several books, the Fieldshop retail store, the Garden & Gun Club restaurant, and about 75 events each year.

The magazine was conceived by Pierre Manigault and John Wilson in 2004 and launched with Rebecca Wesson Darwin as its publisher in 2007 by the Evening Post Publishing Company. The magazine won three ADDY Awards and eight Magazine Association of the Southeast GAMMA awards in its first year, while being named the nation's second-hottest magazine launch in 2007 by MIN Magazine. Since then, the magazine has won many national awards, including National Magazine Awards in 2011, 2014, and 2015, and The Society of Publication Designers Brand of the Year award in 2018.

After Evening Post Publishing decided at the end of 2008 to discontinue its funding of the magazine, it was purchased by Darwin and Evening Post board Chairman Pierre Manigault. Rebecca Wesson Darwin is cofounder & CEO of the Allée Group LLC, formed with partners Pierre Manigault and J. Edward Bell III that owns Garden & Gun.

Garden & Gun is based in Charleston, South Carolina, and covers art, skeet-shooting, gardens, Southern tradition, and land conservation. The name Garden & Gun is explained as an "inside reference to a popular 1970s Charleston disco called the Garden and Gun Club." It is also explained as a metaphor for the South's land, people, lifestyle, and heritage.

Garden & Gun created the Made in the South Awards in 2010 to celebrate and encourage Southern craftsmanship and to recognize the best available Southern-made products. The annual contest calls for entries in six categories: Food, Drink, Home, Style, Crafts, and Outdoors. The overall winner receives a $10,000 cash prize and, along with all category winners and runners-up, is prominently featured in the magazine's December/January issue.

It had one of cartoonist and novelist Doug Marlette's last written works before he died in a car crash. Other writers for the magazine have included Pat Conroy, Roy Blount Jr., Donna Tartt, Julia Reed, Rick Bragg, John T. Edge, Jessica B. Harris, Allison Glock, and Kim Severson. John Wilson was the magazine's founding Editor in Chief while Sid Evans was the magazine's Editor in Chief from 2008 to fall 2011. David DiBenedetto began his role as Editor in Chief beginning with the December 2011/January 2012 issue.

References

External links
 

2007 establishments in the United States
Bimonthly magazines published in the United States
Lifestyle magazines published in the United States
Culture of the Southern United States
Magazines established in 2007
Magazines published in South Carolina
Mass media in Charleston, South Carolina